The Elcar Seven Passenger Sedan-8-80 was manufactured by Elkhart Carriage Company of Elkhart, Indiana.

Elcar Seven Passenger Sedan-8-80 specifications (1926 data) 

 Color – Light or dark coach blue or Thebes gray
 Seating Capacity – Seven
 Wheelbase – 127 inches
 Wheels – Steel or wood
 Tires - 32” x 6.20” balloon
 Service Brakes – Hydraulic, contracting on four wheels
 Emergency Brakes – Contracting on front universal
 Engine  - Eight cylinder, vertical, cast en block, 3-1/8 x 4-1/4 inches (260.78 c.i.d.; 4.273 liters); valves in side; H.P. 31.25 N.A.C.C. rating
 Lubrication – Full force feed
 Crankshaft - Five bearing
 Radiator – Cellular type
 Cooling – Water pump
 Ignition – Storage Battery
 Starting System – Single Unit
 Voltage – Six 
 Wiring System – Single
 Gasoline System – Vacuum
 Clutch – Dry plate
 Transmission – Selective sliding
 Gear Changes – 3 forward, 1 reverse
 Drive – Hotchkiss
 Springs – Semi-elliptic
 Rear Axle – Three-quarter floating
 Steering Gear – Cam and lever

Standard equipment
New car price included the following items:
 combination tail and stop lights
 two lights on instrument board
 electric horn
 speedometer
 ammeter
 oil gauge
 motometer
 automatic gasoline gauge on instrument board
 bumpers front and rear
 snubbers all around
 automatic windshield wiper
 rear vision mirror
 cowl ventilator
 extra rim and carrier
 pump
 jack
 tools
 repair kit
 robe rail
 foot rail
 enclosed models have heaters

Optional equipment
The following was available at an extra cost:
 none listed

Prices
New car prices were F.O.B. factory, plus Tax:
 8-80 Five Passenger Touring - $2165
 8-80 Seven Passenger Touring - $2265
 8-80 Four Passenger Open Roadster - $2315
 8-80 Three Passenger Coupé Roadster - $2315
 8-80 Five Passenger Sedan - $2265
 8-80 Seven Passenger Sedan - $2765
 8-80 Five Passenger Brougham - $2865

See also
 Elcar

References
Source: 

Cars of the United States